Fletcher Anderson is a New Zealand rugby union player who plays for  in the Bunnings NPC. His position is Flanker.

Career 
Anderson was part of the Crusaders Academy in 2021 and 2022. He was named in the Tasman Mako squad for the 2022 Bunnings NPC as a injury replacement player. He made his debut in Round 4, coming off the bench against . Anderson plays club rugby in the Christchurch Metro Premier competition where he captains the UC Senior Team. He was selected for NZ Schools 2020. He has played for the Crusaders U20 in both 2021 and 2022 and for NZ University in 2022. He won rookie of the at the 2022 Mako awards. He studies Finance and Law.

References 

New Zealand rugby union players
Tasman rugby union players
Living people
People educated at Christ's College, Christchurch
Rugby union flankers
Rugby union number eights
2002 births